Queensborough or Queensboro may refer to:

Places and geographic features
Queens, one of the five boroughs of New York City
Queensborough, British Columbia, a neighbourhood in New Westminster, Canada; also the original name of that city
Queensborough, Ontario, Canada, an unincorporated community
Queensborough River, a river in  Victoria and New South Wales, Australia
Queensboro Hill, Queens, a hill in Flushing, Queens, New York City
Queensboro Ward, a former municipal ward in the city of Ottawa, Canada

Bridges
Queensborough Bridge, linking the New Westminster neighbourhood to the rest of New Westminster, in British Columbia, Canada
Queensboro Bridge, over the East River in New York City

Subway systems
Queensborough Line, former name of a portion of the IRT Flushing Line of the New York City subway system
Queensboro Plaza (New York City Subway), a subway station

Other uses
Queensborough Community College in the City University of New York system, New York City, United States
Queensboro Corporation, a defunct real estate company in Queens, New York City
Queensboro FC, an upcoming professional soccer team in Queens, New York City
Queensboro Correctional Facility, one of the New York state prisons in the United States

See also
 Queenborough, Isle of Sheppey, Kent, England
 HMAS Queenborough, a Q-class destroyer in the Royal Navy and Royal Australian Navy
 Queensburgh, KwaZulu-Natal in South Africa
 Queenstown (disambiguation)
 Queenston (disambiguation)